Aleksei Kozlov (born 23 January 1999) is a Russian professional footballer who plays for Naftan Novopolotsk.

His brother Yevgeni Kozlov is also a professional footballer.

References

External links 
 
 

1999 births
Living people
People from Sergiyev Posad
Sportspeople from Moscow Oblast
Russian footballers
Russian expatriate footballers
Expatriate footballers in Latvia
Expatriate footballers in Lithuania
Expatriate footballers in Belarus
Expatriate footballers in Kazakhstan
Russian expatriate sportspeople in Belarus
Association football goalkeepers
FK Spartaks Jūrmala players
FK Utenis Utena players
FC Irtysh Omsk players
FC Torpedo-BelAZ Zhodino players
FC Gomel players
FC Minsk players
FC Caspiy players
FC Naftan Novopolotsk players